Typhoon Chaba, known in the Philippines as Typhoon Igme, was the fourth most intense tropical cyclone in 2016 and the strongest tropical cyclone to make landfall in South Korea since Sanba in 2012. Chaba also caused 7 deaths in the country. Typhoon Chaba was the eighteenth named storm and the eighth typhoon of the 2016 Pacific typhoon season.

Meteorological history

Despite a marginally favorable environment, the Japan Meteorological Agency (JMA) upgraded the system to a tropical storm and assigned it the name Chaba late the next day. Early on September 28, the Joint Typhoon Warning Center (JTWC) gave the identifier of 21W. Flaring convection and improved overall convective structure prompted the JTWC to upgrade it to a tropical storm. By September 30, Chaba had intensified into a severe tropical storm after deep convection had evolved into a banding feature and very favorable conditions such as very low wind shear and sea surface temperatures (SSTs) of about 30 degrees Celsius. On October 1, Chaba entered the Philippine area of responsibility, with PAGASA assigning the local name Igme, as it started to move in a northwestward direction. Several hours later, both agencies upgraded Chaba to a typhoon after its organization and structure had vastly improved. During the next day, Chaba became more symmetric as feeder bands wrapped into its deep central convection, signalling the onset of explosive intensification.

Thereafter, the JTWC stated that Chaba began weakening, as its core became asymmetric, and Chaba weakened to a strong Category 4 typhoon by October 4. Later, significant weakening led the JTWC to downgrade Chaba further to a Category 2 typhoon, due to interaction with strong north-northeasterly winds. At 10:00 a.m. At that time, Chaba started to undergo extratropical transition and the JTWC issued its final advisory a few hours later, while downgrading the system to a tropical storm. At the same time, the JMA downgraded Chaba to a severe tropical storm. Six hours later, the JMA issued its final advisory, as Chaba became extratropical.

Preparations and impact
EVA Air and China Airlines canceled flights to Okinawa that had been scheduled for 3 October, which was the day the typhoon was forecast to impact Okinawa. EVA Air had previously been criticized for operating flights to destinations affected by typhoons a week earlier, when Typhoon Megi was affecting the region.

The storm left widespread damage across the southern regions of South Korea, killing at least 7 and leaving 3 missing. Transportation was disrupted, with hundreds of flights canceled, while more than 220,000 households lost electricity. Chaba was the strongest typhoon to strike the country since Sanba in 2012, and was the strongest October typhoon to hit Korea, establishing a new record for rainfall rate on Jeju Island. Flooding was also reported in the southern South Korea cities of Ulsan, Gyeongju, and Busan. Damages were reported at  billion (US$129 million).

See also

 Tropical cyclones in 2016
 Typhoon Emma (1956) – which took a similar track to Sarah.
 Typhoon Sarah (1959) – one of the deadliest typhoons on record.
 Typhoon Maemi (2003) – the most powerful typhoon to strike South Korea since record-keeping in 1904
 Typhoon Sanba (2012) – a powerful and damaging typhoon that made landfall over South Korea in September 2012

References

External links

Track of Typhoon Chaba (1618) from Digital Typhoon

21W.CHABA from the U.S. Naval Research Laboratory

2016 Pacific typhoon season
Typhoons
Typhoons in Japan
Typhoons in South Korea
Chaba